Seven-league boots are an element in European folklore. The boots allow the person wearing them to take strides of seven leagues per step, resulting in great speed. The boots are often presented by a magical character to the protagonist to aid in the completion of a significant task.

Mention of the legendary boots are found in:
 Germany – Sweetheart Roland, Adelbert von Chamisso's Peter Schlemiel, Goethe's Faust (Mephistopheles uses them at the start of Part Two, Act Four ), Wilhelm Hauff's "Der Kleine Muck"
 France – Charles Perrault's - Hop o' My Thumb, Madame d'Aulnoy's The Bee and the Orange Tree, Marcel Proust’s In Search of Lost Time.
 Norway – Peter Christen Asbjørnsen and Jørgen Moe - Soria Moria Castle 
 Britain – Jack the Giant Killer, John Masefield's The Midnight Folk, C.S. Lewis's The Pilgrim's Regress, Wizardoligy, A Guide to Wizards of the World, Terry Pratchett's The Light Fantastic, The Bartimaeus Trilogy, Jenny Nimmo's Midnight for Charlie Bone, Diana Wynne Jones' Howl's Moving Castle, Evelyn Waugh's "The Loved One," E. Nesbit's "The Enchanted Castle," George Eliot’s “The Mill On The Floss,”
 United States – Zane Grey's The Last of the Plainsmen, Ruth Chew's "What the Witch Left," Gail Carson Levine's "The Two Princesses of Bamarre," Mark Twain's "The Innocents Abroad," Roger Zelazny's "Bring Me the Head of Prince Charming," Clair Blank's "Beverly Gray at the World's Fair", Kelly Barnhill's "The Girl Who Drank the Moon,", and Nathaniel Hawthorne's "The Village Uncle."
 Russia - Arkady and Boris Strugatsky's "Monday Starts on Saturday".

Etymology 
From the context of English language, 'Seven-league boots' originally arose as a translation from the French , popularised by Charles Perrault's fairy tales. A league (roughly ) was considered to represent the distance walked in an hour by an average man. In the 17th century, post-boys' boots were called 'seven-league boots'. While some suggest that the 'seven leagues' references the distance between post houses (post-boys would only have their boots touch the ground at every coach inn, when changing the horses), this is inaccurate: the distance between coach inns was fixed at no more than five leagues.

Other variations

In fiction

Folklore 

 Russian folklore has a similar magic item called Сапоги-Скороходы (fast-pace boots), which allows the person wearing them to walk and run at an amazing pace.
 Japanese scholar Kunio Yanagita listed a tale titled The Thousand-ri Boots from Yamanashi, and wondered about its great similarity to a tale in the Pentamerone with a pair of seven-league boots.

References

External links
 

Boots
Mythological clothing
Recurrent elements in fairy tales
Magic items
Fictional footwear